Miguel Ángel Gamondi (born 1 December 1963) is an Argentine football manager and former player who manages Botola club Ittihad Tanger.

Career
Born in Olavarría, Gamondi played football for local side Club Ferrocarril Sud.

After he retired from playing, Gamondi managed several clubs in Argentina, including Ferro Carril Sud, Racing, El Fortín, San Martín de Tucumán and Racing Club de Avellaneda.

In 2000, Gamondi moved to Africa to be join Oscar Fulloné as an assistant coach to the Libyan side Al-Ahly. He also became an assistant coach to Oscar Fulloné at the Burkina Faso national football team in December 2001, and would later become an assistant coach at ASEC Mimosas, Wydad Casablanca, Espérance Sportive de Tunis and Étoile du Sahel.

He was appointed assistant manager to Ángel Cappa at South African side Mamelodi Sundowns in 2005. Then he was appointed manager of Platinum Stars in December 2007, and led Stars into the final 16 of the 2008 CAF Confederation Cup, its first foray into continental competition.

Later on, he managed CR Belouizdad and USM Alger in Algeria, Ittihad Kalba and Al Urooba in the United Arab Emirates, then Hassania Agadir, Wydad AC and Ittihad Tanger in Morocco.

References

1963 births
Living people
Argentine footballers
Association footballers not categorized by position
Argentine football managers
Racing Club de Avellaneda managers
Mamelodi Sundowns F.C. managers
Hassania Agadir managers
Platinum Stars F.C. managers
CR Belouizdad managers
Al-Ittihad Kalba SC managers
USM Alger managers
Wydad AC managers
Argentine expatriate football managers
Argentine expatriate sportspeople in Libya
Argentine expatriate sportspeople in Morocco
Argentine expatriate sportspeople in Tunisia
Expatriate soccer managers in South Africa
Argentine expatriate sportspeople in South Africa
Expatriate football managers in Morocco
Expatriate football managers in Algeria
Argentine expatriate sportspeople in Algeria
Expatriate football managers in the United Arab Emirates
Argentine expatriate sportspeople in the United Arab Emirates
Argentine expatriate sportspeople in Burkina Faso
Sportspeople from Buenos Aires Province
Botola managers